Argyrocopeum, also transliterated as Argyrocopeion or Argyrokopeion  was the place where money was coined in ancient Greece, especially minting with silver. In Athens it appears to have been in or adjoining the chapel (heroön) of a hero named Stephanephorus, in which were kept the standard weights for the coins. In similar fashion, standard weights were kept in the Temple of Juno Moneta in the Roman Forum.

See also
Laurium, the place of the silver mint in Attica, outside Athens.

References
Pollux, vii. 103; Harpocration.; Suidas.,; Bockh, Corp..Inscr. vol. i. p. 164, and the explanation of that inscription in his Public Economy of Athens^ p. 144,. 2nd ed.; comp. talentbm.)
αργυροκοπ- inscriptions.

Ancient Athens
Economy of ancient Greece
Greek words and phrases